Shayan Chowdhury Arnob, known professionally as Arnob, is a Bangladeshi singer-songwriter, musician, painter, filmmaker, animator and producer. Arnob is the lead singer of his own band Arnob & Friends.

Arnob was the founder of indie folk band Bangla which stayed active for a decade before going into hiatus in the late 2000s. Arnob continued performing with some of the band members as Arnob and Friends. He also briefly collaborated with Prayer Hall, a Bangladeshi rock band.

Arnob gained nationwide recognition as a solo artist for his title track She Je Boshe Ache for the 2004 TV drama Offbeat. The song also appeared in his first solo album Chaina Bhabish, released in 2005. This album was followed by his two notable solo albums Hok Kolorob and Doob, cementing his position as a prominent musician in Bangladesh. In 2009, Arnob released his first live album Arnob & Friends Live, which featured songs from his international tour in October 2008. , Arnob released seven solo albums, and composed film scores for several notable Bengali language films, which include Monpura, Jaago, Aynabaji and Under Construction.

In 2022, Arnob produced the inaugural season of Coke Studio Bangla, the Bangladeshi incarnation of the Coke Studio franchise.

Life and career

Early years
Arnob was born in Dhaka on 27 January 1978, to painter couple Swapan Chowdhury and Suraiya Chowdhury. Swapan Chowdhury was a member of the traveling music band that participated in the Bangladesh Liberation War of 1971, and was featured in the documentary Muktir Gaan. Arnob's uncle Tapan Chowdhury, was a prominent solo-artist and a member of the Bangladeshi rock band Souls. He is a cousin to Bangladeshi actress, model and singer Rafiath Rashid Mithila.

Arnob started schooling at Willes Little Flower School in Dhaka. However, in 1985, at the insistence of his mother, Arnob was admitted to Patha Bhavana, a school affiliated with Vishva Bharati at Santiniketan, West Bengal, India. While at Patha Bhavana, he took lessons in Esraj and taught himself to play keyboard and guitar. He was also exposed to a wide range of musical styles, ranging from western music to the local baul traditions, and started composing music with his friends at this time. However, in a 2014 interview to a Bangladeshi magazine, he confessed:

1990s

1995–1999: Visva Bharati University and the formation of Bangla
After completing high school education, Arnob enrolled in the Visva Bharati University in 1995 to study at the Fine Arts Academy (Kala bhavana). In 1998, when he was a fourth-year student, he formed an indie folk fusion band named Bangla. His family friend Anusheh Anadil learned about his project while visiting Shantiniketan and joined the band a vocalist. Anusheh brought in bassist Buno to the band, who had prior experience in folk fusion. With the new lineup, the band had their first performance in Kolkata Book Fair in January 1999.

2000s

2000–2007: Relocation to Dhaka, debut album of Bangla and going solo
Arnob returned to Dhaka in 1999. The same year instrumentalists Kartik, Shantunu and Nazrul joined Bangla. The band had their first formal concert at Sheraton Hotel in Dhaka in October,1999.

In 2002, Bangla took part in "the Benson and Hedges Star Search" competition, and Arnob received the Award for Best Instrumentalist for playing esraj. The same year, Bangla released its debut album, Kingkortobbobimurho.

In 2004, his first solo song 'She Je Boshe Ache' was released as the title track of the teleplay-off Beat, which started at 36:55 of the teleplay. In the fall of 2004, Arnob signed a contract with Ektaar for one year. He started the recording of his debut album, Chaina Bhabish, in March 2005 in the EML studio in Gulshan, Dhaka. It ended in May and the album was released on 1 June 2005. Two songs in the album was written by Arnob, "She Je Boshe Ache" and "Chuya Chuyi".

Arnob began 2006 by signing with a new label, Bengal Music Company. His next album, Hok Kolorob, was recorded in 2005 in BMC studio, which mostly contained songs by Taufiqe Riaz.  One track on this album, "Tomar Jonno" was written by Sahana Bajpaie and composed by Arnob. The self-titled song, "Hok Kolorob" was called by many a protest song. It was used as a slogan in the 2014 Jadavpur University Students movement. About that he said to Indian Express: "My politics is a gut reaction, guided by practicality rather than an ideology. I don’t consider myself to be a political person, I couldn’t say if I am right-wing or left-wing. Things have to make sense for me to throw my weight behind it". In this album, Arnob has co-written four songs alongside Taufiqe, Sahana and Milita and wrote only one full song, "Chalak Tumi". The same year, Arnob won two Channel i Music Awards: "Best Album Artwork" award for the artwork of Hok Kolorob and "Best Rock Album" award for his participation in Prayer Hall's album Bujhcho.  He also composed many songs in Sahana's debut album Notun Kore Pabo Bole, which was released in 2007.

2008–2009: Doob and world tour
Arnob's early April 2008 album, Doob contained mostly new songs and more electrically amplified rock songs than his previous albums. The album featured many contemporary artists like, Sahana Bajpaie, Zohad Reza Chowdhury (Nemesis), the Mak, Idris Rahman, Saad and Andrew Morris. This album also marks as his first to feature a rabindra sangeet, "Noyon Tomare". "Shopno Debe Doob", a song written by Sahana was included in the Poems Collection of Shonkho Ghosh. Many critics said that "it didn't match the success and popularity of his previous albums".

In the mid-2008, Arnob backed up by Nazia Ahmed (vocals), Resalat Dhrubo (bass guitars), Jibon (drums) and Nazrul (dhol) took part in a world tour, organised by Drishtipat and sponsored by HSBC. The tour only contained five concerts in Washington, New York City, Texas, Toronto and London. The concert was arranged to raise money for Drishtipat's project "Child Domestic Workers Education" and some other development projects in Bangladesh. In November 2009, Arnob released a live album named Arnob & Friends Live: Songs from the World Tour '08 from BMC. In 2009, he started his own record label named Adhkana Records.  .

2010s

2010–present: Rod Boleche Hobe to Ondho Sohor
Arnob's fourth studio album, Rod Boleche Hobe was released in October 2010. Recorded and released from his own label, Adhkhana Studio, the CD booklet of this album featured artworks and poems by Arnob. 

Arnob recorded a whole rabindra sangeet album in the popular music scene, Adheko Ghume. It was released by BMC in June 2012 and was recorded in Adhkhana studio. It was a tribute to Rabindranath Tagore and a homage to his life at Santiniketan.

In May 2015, Arnob's sixth studio album Khub Doob came out from Adhkhana Studio.

Arnob's first documentary film, Introspection, was on his father Swapan Chowdhury for one of his exhibitions on his water color series hosted by Bengal foundation.

In 2017, Arnob released his seventh solo album Ondho Shohor on the smartphone-based music streaming service Yonder Music. The album featured 17 eclectic tracks that included original tracks, previously released movie soundtracks and Tagore song renditions, as well as three English language songs.

Bangladeshi streaming service Chorki released a documentary biographical film on Arnob's musical career, titled Adhkhana Bhalo Chele, Adha Mostaan, in 2021.

In 2022, Arnob collaborated with a number of prominent and emerging Bangladeshi artists to produce the inaugural season of Coke Studio Bangla.

Personal life
While attending Patha Bhavana at Santiniketan, Arnob met Sahana Bajpaie. The couple were married in 2000. Between 2005 and 2008, Sahana contributed lyrics to Arnob's songs and sang backup vocal in some of them, while Arnob directed music for Sahana's debut album, Notun Kore Pabo Bole. The couple were divorced in the fall of 2008.  Arnob started dating Indian singer Sunidhi Nayak in 2019, and married her in October 2020.

On religion, Arnob told the Indian Express that "For people of our generation, religion was never a big deal....Bangladesh is a republic with an Islamic majority. Why would you insist on non-Islamic people adhering to the same religious injunctions? Why not leave it to choice?". He is an amateur football player and holds a green belt in Karate.

Discography

 Chaina Bhabish (2005)
 Hok Kolorob (2006)
 Doob (2008)
 Rod Boleche Hobe (2010)
 Adheko Ghume (2012)
 Khub Doob (2015)
 Ondho Shohor (2017)

See also
 Notable people associated with Santiniketan

References

External links

 Shayan Chowdhury Arnob on Last.fm
 Shayan Chowdhury Arnob on Spotify

Living people
21st-century Bangladeshi musicians
Bangladeshi guitarists
21st-century Bangladeshi male singers
21st-century Bangladeshi singers
1978 births